Trappist monks started producing Mont des Cats cheeses in 1890. The cheese is produced using cows milk from local sources and has a fat content of 50%. While maturing for at least two months the cheese is washed with salted water containing a dye made from annatto seeds which gives the rind its characteristic orange color.

References

French cheeses
Cow's-milk cheeses